The New Korea Party (NKP) was founded by the merging of Roh Tae-woo's Democratic Justice Party, Kim Young-sam's Reunification Democratic Party and Kim Jong-pil's New Democratic Republican Party to form the Democratic Liberal Party (DLP). It was renamed to New Korea Party in 1995.

In 1997, the NKP merged with the Democratic Party to form the Grand National Party.

Election results

President

Legislature

Local

Notes

References

1990 establishments in South Korea
1997 disestablishments in South Korea
Anti-communism in South Korea
Anti-communist parties
Conservative parties in South Korea
Defunct political parties in South Korea
National conservative parties
Liberty Korea Party
Political parties disestablished in 1997
Political parties established in 1990
Right-wing parties
Right-wing politics in South Korea